Dum Dum Girls is the debut EP by Dum Dum Girls, released in 2008 by frontwoman Dee Dee's own label, Zoo Music. The release was initially limited to 100 pressings, but was later repressed in CD-R format by Sub Pop and offered to those who preordered their debut album, I Will Be.

Track listing
All songs written and composed by Dee Dee, except as noted.

References

2008 EPs
Dum Dum Girls albums